"Big Sky Country" is a song recorded by American singer-songwriter and guitarist, Chris Whitley. It was the second single to be released from his 1991 début album, Living with the Law, and became a hit single in the United States, rising to No. 35 on the Billboard Mainstream Rock chart in 1991.

Music video
The music video features Whitley singing and playing his 1931 National Triolian in a variety of indoor and outdoor (Spanish mission / cemetery, midway, and American desert) environments. Parts of the video were filmed in stop motion animation. Bassist Alan Gevaert and a drummer appear in some scenes.

Cover versions

John Mayer has covered the song live.

Personnel

Chris Whitley – National acoustic guitar, guitar, vocal, bass, and synth guitar
Bill Dillon – guitar, pedal steel, and guitorgan
Ronald Jones – drums
Produced by Malcolm Burn
Recorded by Mark Howard
Mixed by Malcolm Burn and Mark Howard

Charts

References

1991 singles
1991 songs
Columbia Records singles